The United States Air Force's 11th Air Support Operations Squadron was a combat support unit located at Fort Hood, Texas. The squadron provided tactical command and control of airpower assets to the Joint Forces Air Component Commander and Joint Forces Land Component Commander for combat operations.

History

World War II
The squadron saw combat in the European Theater of Operations from D-Day to V-E Day.  Its air support parties primarily served United States Third Army units, directing air support missions for the ground forces they served.  It provided three teams that participated in airborne and amphibious landings in the initial 6 Jun 1944 D-Day invasion.

Post Cold War
The squadron was reactivated as the 11th Air Support Operations Squadron in 1994 to support the 3rd Cavalry Regiment.  It provided Air Liaison Officers, Joint Terminal Attack Controllers and Combat Mission Support Teams that administered airpower to ground forces until inactivating in 2018. After 24 years of service, the squadron was inactivated in a ceremony at Fort Hood, Texas on 21 June 2018. Personnel of the unit were absorbed into the 9th Air Support Operations Squadron, also based at Fort Hood.

Lineage
 Constituted as the 11th Communications Squadron, Air Support on 9 September 1942
 Activated on 18 Sep 1942
 Redesignated 11th Air Support Communication Squadron on 11 January 1943
 Redesignated 11th Air Support Control Squadron on 20 August 1943
 Redesignated 11th Tactical Air Communications Squadron on 1 April 1944
 Inactivated on 12 October 1945
 Disbanded on 8 October 1948
 Reconstituted and redesignated 11th Air Support Operations Squadron on 24 June 1994
 Activated on 1 July 1994.
 Inactivated c. 21 June 2018

Assignments
 III Air Support Command (later III Reconnaissance Command, III Tactical Air Command), 18 September 1942
 IX Fighter Command, 11 December 1943
 Ninth Air Force, c. 1 February 1944
 IX Air Support Command, 26 February 1944
 XIX Air Support Command (later XIX Tactical Air Command), 4 March 1944
 XII Tactical Air Command, 4 July – c. 12 October 1945
 3d Air Support Operations Group, 1 Jul 1994 – c. 21 June 2018

Stations
 Birmingham Army Air Base, Alabama, 18 September 1942
 Key Field, Mississippi, 26 February 1943
 Lebanon Army Air Field, Tennessee, c. 30 May 1943
 Birmingham Army Air Base, Alabama, c. 22 September – 16 November 1943
 RAF Aldermaston (Sta 467), England, 10 December 1943
 Aldermaston Court (Sta 476), England, 14 January 1944
 Sunninghill Park (Sta 472), England, 12 February 1944
 Aldermaston Court (Sta 476) England, 1 March 1944
 Cricqueville Airfield (A-2), France, 9 Jul 1944
 Nehou, France, 12 July 1944
 Le Bingard, France, 31 July 1944
 Mesnil-Rousset, France, 4 August 1944
 Poilley, France, 8 August 1944
 Andouille, France, 16 August 1944
 Autainville, France, 31 August 1944
 Chalons-en-Champagne, France, 13 September 1944
 Etain Airfield (A-82), France, 24 September 1944
 Nancy, France, 14 October 1944
 Luxembourg, Luxembourg, 16 January 1945
 Idar-Oberstein, Germany, 28 March 1945
 Hersfeld, Germany, 9 April 1945
 Erlangen (R-96), Germany, 26 April – c. September 1945
 Camp Patrick Henry, Virginia, 12 Oct 1945
 Fort Hood, Texas, 1 Jul 1994 – c. 21 June 2018

References

Notes
 Explanatory notes

 Citations

Bibliography
}
 
 

Air Support Operations 0011
Military units and formations in Texas